Bastamlu (also Romanized as Basţāmlū) is a village in Bastamlu Rural District, in the Central District of Khoda Afarin County, East Azerbaijan Province, Iran. At the 2006 census, its population was 598, in 127 families.

References 

Populated places in Khoda Afarin County